Grimshaw Architects (formerly Nicholas Grimshaw & Partners) is an architectural firm based in London. Founded in 1980 by 
Nicholas Grimshaw, the firm was one of the pioneers of high-tech architecture. In particular, they are known for their design of transport projects including Amsterdam Bijlmer ArenA railway station, Waterloo International railway station and the award-winning Southern Cross railway station which was the recipient of the Royal Institute of British Architects Lubetkin Prize. Grimshaw is behind the design of the Sustainability Pavilion, an innovative net-zero building, for Expo 2020. The firm currently has offices in Los Angeles, New York, London, Paris, Dubai, Melbourne and Sydney, employing over 600 staff.

Organisation

Partners
Grimshaw has 21 partners worldwide: Jolyon Brewis, Keith Brewis, Andrew Byrne, Vincent Chang, Andrew Cortese, Nicholas Grimshaw, William Horgan, Mark Husser, Michael Janeke, Ewan Jones, Annelie Kvick Thompson, Kirsten Lees, Declan McCafferty, Neill McClements, Mark Middleton, Andrew Perez, Juan Porral, Neven Sidor, Neil Stonell, Andrew Thomas, and Andrew Whalley.

Project list
Major projects, by year of completion and ordered by type, are:

Arts and culture

Oxford Ice Rink, Oxford, UK, 1984
British Pavilion, Expo '92, Seville, Spain, 1992
Eden Project, Cornwall, UK, 2001
National Space Centre, Leicester, UK, 2001
Caixa Galicia Art Foundation, A Coruña, Spain, 2006
Thermae Bath Spa, Bath, 2006
Horno 3: Museo del Acero, Museum of Steel, Monterrey, Mexico, 2007
Experimental Media and Performing Arts Center (EMPAC), Troy, US, 2008
Mobilizarte Mobile Pavilion, Brazil, 2012
Queens Museum of Art, Queens, 2013
Phillip and Patricia Frost Museum of Science, Miami, US 2014
Shanghai Disney Resort Tomorrowland, Shanghai, China, 2016
Arter (art center) Contemporary Art Museum, Istanbul, Turkey, 2019
Sustainability Pavilion, Expo 2020 Dubai, 2020

Bridges

IJburg Bridge, Amsterdam, The Netherlands, 2001
Newport City footbridge, Newport, South Wales, 2006
Seafarers Bridge, Melbourne, Australia, 2008
A40 Western Avenue Footbridge, London, UK, 2009

Science and education
Eden Project: The Core, Cornwall, UK, 2005
University College London: Roberts Building Front Extension, London, UK, 2007
University College London Cancer Institute: Paul O Gorman Building, London, UK, 2007
London School of Economics: New Academic Building, London, UK, 2009
London South Bank University, London, UK, 2010
New York University Polytechnic: Rogers Hall, Brooklyn, US, 2011
Doherty Institute, Melbourne, Australia, 2014
Boldrewood Innovation Campus Phase 1, Southampton, UK, 2015
University of New South Wales Hilmer Building, Sydney, Australia, 2015
Bangor University Arts and Innovation Centre, Bangor, UK, 2016
Dulwich College Laboratory, London, UK, 2016
Duke University, The Richard H. Brodhead Center for Campus Life, Durham, NC, USA, 2016

Rail

International Terminal, Waterloo Station, London, UK, 1993
Paddington Station, London, UK, 1999
Southern Cross railway station, Melbourne, Australia, 2006
Amsterdam Bijlmer ArenA Station, Amsterdam, Netherlands, 2007
Nunawading railway station, Melbourne, Australia, 2010
Fulton Center, Manhattan, US, 2014
Reading railway station, Reading, UK, 2014
London Bridge station, London, UK, 2018
Mernda railway line Extension, Melbourne, Australia, 2018
Vaughan Metropolitan Centre (TTC) station, Vaughan, Canada, 2018
Sydney CBD and South East Light Rail, Sydney, Australia, 2019

Aviation

Heathrow Airport Terminal 1, Pier 4A, UK, 1993
Manchester Airport Terminal 3, UK, 1998
Zurich Airport, Zurich, Switzerland, 2004
Heathrow Airport Terminal 2B, UK, 2009
Pulkovo Airport, St. Petersburg, Russia, 2013
Istanbul Airport Turkey, 2019
Newark Liberty International New Terminal A, Newark, USA, 2022

Office and workplace

British Airways Operations, London, UK, 1993
RAC Regional Control Centre, Bristol, UK, 1994
Ludwig Erhaud Haus, Berlin, Germany, 1998
Orange Operational Centre and Customer Service Facilities, Darlington, UK, 1998
25 Gresham Street, London, UK, 2002
Eden Project: The Foundation, Cornwall, UK, 2002
Five Boats Houding, Duisburg, Germany, 2005
385 Bourke Street, Melbourne, Australia, 2008
The St Botolphs Building, London, UK, 2010
John Lewis & Partners Fashion Pavilion, London, UK, 2011
Highpoint Shopping Centre, Melbourne, Australia, 2013
699 Bourke Street, Melbourne, Australia, 2015
333 George Street, Sydney, Australia, 2016
YOOX Net-a-Porter Group Tech Hub, London, UK, 2017
Plexal Innovation Centre, London, UK, 2017
Belfast City Quays 2, Belfast, Northern Ireland, 2018
664 Collins Street, Melbourne, Australia, 2018
50/60 Station Road, Cambridge, UK, 2019
Olderfleet, Melbourne, Australia, 2020

Industry

Herman Miller Factory, Bath, Somerset, UK, 1976
Vitra Furniture Factory, Weil am Rhein, Germany, 1981
Herman Miller Factory, Chippenham, UK, 1982
Financial Times Printworks, London, UK, 1988
Western Morning News, Plymouth, UK, 1993
Igus Factory & Headquarters, Cologne, Germany, 2000
Donald Danforth Plant Center, St. Louis, US, 2001
Rolls-Royce Motor Cars Manufacturing Plant & Headquarters, West Sussex, UK, 2003
Suez Environnement Energy from Waste Facility, Suffolk, UK, 2014
Herman Miller (manufacturer) Portal Mill, Melksham, UK, 2015

Mixed use and housing

Sainsbury's Store & Grand Union Walk Housing, London, UK, 1988
Via Verde – The Green Way, The Bronx, US, 2012
Harbour Mill Apartments, Sydney, Australia, 2015

Awards

2019
Royal Institute of British Architects (RIBA) Royal Gold Medal for Architecture awarded to Nicholas Grimshaw
AJ 100: Practice of the Year
AIANY + ASLANY Transportation + Infrastructure Design Excellence Awards—Vaughan Metropolitan Centre station
SCUP Outstanding Achievement in Integrated Planning and Design—Duke University Brodhead Center

2018
SCUP Excellence in Landscape Architecture (General Design)—Duke University Brodhead Center 
World Architecture Festival 'Transport- Completed Buildings' Category Winner—London Bridge station Redevelopment
British Constructional Steelwork Association's Structural Steel Design Award—London Bridge station Redevelopment
British Construction Industry Awards (BCIA), Transport Project of the Year, ICE200 Award—London Bridge station Redevelopment
British Transport Awards, Station of the Year— London Bridge station Redevelopment
City of Sydney Lord Mayor's Prize, NSW AIA Awards, Commendation—333 George Street 
NSW AIA Award, Commendation—333 George Street Interior fit-out
Chicago Athenaeum Award—333 George Street
Design Impact Awards, Australian Interior Design Awards—Highpoint Shopping Centre
AJ 100: International Practice of the Year
New London Awards, Overall Prize—London Bridge station Redevelopment 
New London Awards, Transport and Infrastructure—London Bridge station Redevelopment 
New London Awards, Sustainability Prize—London Bridge station Redevelopment 
RSAW Welsh Architecture Awards—Bangor University, Arts and Innovation Centre

2017
Civic Trust Awards– SUEZ Energy-from-Waste
Civic Trust Awards– Southampton Boldrewood Phase 1
RIBA National Award– The Laboratory, Dulwich College
ICE 'Greatest Contribution to London'– London Bridge station Redevelopment
AJ Retrofit Awards International Retrofit Project– Duke University Brodhead Center
ENR Southeast Best Cultural Project– Phillip and Patricia Frost Museum of Science
ENR Southeast Higher Education/Research Award of Merit– Duke University Brodhead Center

2016
Commonwealth Institute of Architects; Robert Matthew Awards
AJ 100: International Practice of the Year

2015
 AIA New York COTE Award – Via Verde (designed with Dattner Architects)
AIA New York: Medal of Honor
AJ 120: Project of the Year—Fulton Center
BCI Award: International Project of the Year—Fulton Center

2014
MASterworks Award: Best Adaptive Reuse—Queens Museum

2013
Royal Institute of British Architects (RIBA) International Award— Via Verde
2013 AIA Housing and Urban Development Secretary's Award— Via Verde
AIA New York State Award of Excellence— Via Verde

2012
Carbuncle Cup – Building Design Awards

2009
AIA Honor Award – Horno 3: Museo Del Acero

2008
Architectural Practice of the Year – Building Design Awards
World Architect of the Year – Building Design Awards
Transport Architect of the Year – Building Design Awards
2008 RIBA European Award – Amsterdam Bijlmer ArenA Station
Royal Institute of Dutch Architects – Amsterdam Bijlmer ArenA Station
Stirling Prize Runner up – Amsterdam Bijlmer ArenA Station

2007
Lubetkin Prize – Southern Cross Station, Melbourne, Australia
2007 RIBA International Award – Southern Cross Station, Melbourne, Australia

Controversy
In October 2019, UK publications Construction News and Architects' Journal published a joint investigation into fatalities at Istanbul Airport - nicknamed by workers "the cemetery" as so many have died. By this point, the official death toll was 55, but unofficial estimates suggested the figure could "be higher than 400". Grimshaw was one of four architects employed on the airport's design, three of them UK-based (the other two were Scott Brownrigg and Haptic Architects). As concept architects, Grimshaw ceased working on the project before the construction phase, and voiced shock and sadness about what it described as the "alarmingly high number" of subsequent deaths.

Exhibitions 
Grimshaw's first exhibition titled Product + Process debuted in 1988.  The firm has since produced four exhibitions: Structure Space + Skin (1993), Fusion  (1998), Equilibrium (2000), and Micro to Macro: Grimshaw in New York  (2007).  The latest exhibition, Equation: Design Inspired by Nature, launched on Wednesday, 20 February 2013 at The Urban Redevelopment Authority (URA) Centre in Singapore. Equation explores a series of themes that investigate biomimicry, biophilia and ecosystems and their influence on design.

Publications
Grimshaw Architecture: The First Thirty Years
Blue 02: Systems and Structure
Blue 01: Water, Energy and Waste
The Sketchbooks of Nicholas Grimshaw
The Making of Station Amsterdam Bijlmer ArenA
The Architecture of Eden
Equilibrium
Grimshaw: Architecture, Industry and Innovation
Structure, Space and Skin: The Work of Nicholas Grimshaw & Partners
British Pavilion Seville Exposition

See also 
Nicholas Grimshaw buildings and structures
List of architecture firms
List of architects

References

Notes

External links 
Grimshaw Architects web site

Architecture firms based in London
Design companies established in 1984
1984 establishments in England